La Chasse, French for The Hunt, may refer to: 

 Symphony No. 73 (Haydn)
 String Quartet No. 17 (Mozart)
 Piano Sonata No. 18 (Beethoven)
 Caprice No. 9 "The Hunt" in E major: Allegretto, from Niccolò Paganini's 24 Caprices for Solo Violin  
 Étude No. 5 (La chasse) in E major, Franz Liszt's arrangement of this caprice as the fifth of his six Grandes Etudes de Paganini
 La Chasse, a lost opera by Chevalier de Saint-Georges
 La Chasse, Caprice in the style of Cartier, by Fritz Kreisler
 Op. 16, La Chasse For Keyboard, by Muzio Clementi
 Symphony in D major, by Antonio Rosetti
 La Chasse, popular chanson of famed Renaissance composer Clément Janequin (c. 1485 – 1558)
 La Chasse (painting), a 1911 painting by Albert Gleizes
 La Chasse (plaquette), an artwork by Júlia Báthory